Dennis R. Keeney (born July 2, 1937) is an American scientist in soil science and water chemistry. He was the first director of the Leopold Center for Sustainable Agriculture in Ames, Iowa.

Early life and education
Keeney grew up on his family's dairy farm near Runnells, Iowa not far from Des Moines.

He graduated from Iowa State University (ISU) with a B.S. in agronomy. He studied soil science at University of Wisconsin and obtained an M.S., followed by a Ph.D. in agronomy and biochemistry from Iowa State University.

Career
Keeney became a professor of agronomy, and stayed on as faculty member in soils and water chemistry for more than 20 years.

In 1987, the Leopold Center for Sustainable Agriculture was established at ISU, and in 1988 he became its first director. The Leopold Center developed research studies and teaching about the environmental impacts of farming, sustainable agriculture, preservation of natural resources, including soil and water quality, and rural community development. Keeney defined sustainable agriculture as "It means using the resources we have wisely. Probably number one to conserve the soil resource, the water resource, and the land resource. It's a Leopold concept really, because Leopold talked about land as the water, the air, the soil, and the animals living on it."
 
Already in 1988 Keeney examined the energy balance of ethanol fuel as a "renewable" fuel and concluded, that more energy was required to produce ethanol than was retrieved from it then. Keeney retired from the Leopold Center in 1999. He was succeeded by Fred Kirschenmann.

With the corn ethanol industry rapidly expanding between 2000 and 2005, in what Keeney called "...an "irrational exuberance" trip with biofuels" he was one of few Iowa scientists looking at water consumption. In 2009, Keeney published his latest peer-reviewed paper on the "Environmental, social, economic, and food issues brought on by the rapidly expanding ethanol-from-corn industry in the United States".  he has continued to publicly question its benefits.

He was president of the Soil Science Society of America and the American Society of Agronomy.

 he consults as a Senior Fellow for the Institute for Agriculture and Trade Policy in Minneapolis and the Department of Soil, Air and Water at the University of Minnesota. He is a visiting scholar for the Center for a Livable Future, Johns Hopkins University.

In February 2015 his memoir “The Keeney Place: A Life in the Heartland” was published after nine years of work.

Selected publications
Keeney has published over 140 peer reviewed papers on soil and water quality research.
Dennis Keeney “The Keeney Place: A Life in the Heartland”, Levins Publishing. 110 pages. Website: thekeeneyplace.com
Nitrogen and the Mississippi  September 11, 2000, IATP
Nitrogen and the Upper Mississippi River  March 17, 2002, IATP
Testimony to the US Commission on Ocean Policy, September 30, 2002
The New Road  April 15, 2003
Genetically Modified Crops and Integrated Pest Management adoption  April 15, 2003
Shallow Water October 12, 2003
Performance Based Approach to Control of Agricultural Non Point Source Pollution  October 20, 2003
Our fragile food supply September 2, 2004
Reducing Nutrients in the Mississippi River and the Gulf of Mexico December 14, 2006
Biofuel and Global Biodiversity May 5, 2008
Agriculture Sustainability February 28, 2010
Colonialism is not dead  March 21, 2010
Drought in my life August 6, 2012
Resiliency, agriculture and the 2012 drought August 14, 2012

References

External links
Dennis Keeney: Ethanol's Power Politics; interview by Ben Kieffer, host of The Exchange on Iowa Public Radio, 5 May 2007.
Ethanol Production: Environmental Effects PowerPoint slides (pdf) for presentation at 24th Proceedings, Red River Basin Commission, 3MB, February 9, 2007.
 Interview "A Life in the Heartland:" Dennis Keeney Reflects on Mid-Century Farming by Charity Nebbe, Iowa Public Radio, 45 min, 2 March 2015

1937 births
People from Polk County, Iowa
Iowa State University faculty
Iowa State University alumni
 University of Wisconsin–Madison College of Agricultural and Life Sciences alumni
Sustainability advocates
American agronomists
Living people
University of Wisconsin–Madison faculty
University of Minnesota fellows
Johns Hopkins University people